Ban Mai is one of the six subdistricts (tambon) of Bang Yai District, in Nonthaburi Province, Thailand. Neighbouring subdistricts are (from north clockwise) Nong Phrao Ngai, Bang Khu Rat, Bang Mae Nang, Bang Yai and Khlong Yong. In 2020 it had a total population of 9,206 people.

Administration

Central administration
The subdistrict is subdivided into 11 administrative villages (muban).

Local administration
The area of the subdistrict is shared by two local administrative organizations.
Bang Yai Subdistrict Municipality
Ban Mai Subdistrict Administrative Organization

References

External links
Website of Bang Yai Subdistrict Municipality
Website of Ban Mai Subdistrict Administrative Organization

Tambon of Nonthaburi province
Populated places in Nonthaburi province